The 2008–09 Slovenian Third League was the 17th season of the Slovenian Third League, the third highest level in the Slovenian football system.

Clubs East

League standing

Clubs West

League standing

See also
2008–09 Slovenian Second League

References

External links
Football Association of Slovenia 

Slovenian Third League seasons
3
Slovenia